Gennaro Filomarino, C.R. (1591–1650) was a Roman Catholic prelate who served as Bishop of Calvi Risorta (1623–1650).

Biography
Gennaro Filomarino was born in 1591 and ordained a priest in the Congregation of Clerics Regular of the Divine Providence.
On 18 December 1623, he was appointed during the papacy of Pope Urban VIII as Bishop of Calvi Risorta.
On 24 December 1623, he was consecrated bishop by Cosimo de Torres, Cardinal-Priest of San Pancrazio, with Alessandro di Sangro, Archbishop of Benevento, and Giuseppe Acquaviva, Titular Archbishop of Thebae, serving as co-consecrators. 
He served as Bishop of Calvi Risorta until his death in October 1650.

Episcopal succession
While bishop, he was the principal co-consecrator of:
Ascanio Filomarino, Archbishop of Naples (1642); and
Vincenzo Maculani, Archbishop of Benevento (1642).

References

External links and additional sources
 (for Chronology of Bishops) 
 (for Chronology of Bishops) 

17th-century Italian Roman Catholic bishops
Bishops appointed by Pope Urban VIII
1591 births
1650 deaths